Plogue Art et Technologie, Inc. is an incorporated company based in Montreal, Quebec, Canada that develops music software including Bidule, chipsounds, Alter/Ego and chipspeech.

The name Plogue was chosen as it means "plug" in Quebec Anglicism/slang.

The company also has interesting old chips and many of its software releases focus on recreating the older synthesizer chips from the pre-90s.  Much of David Viens' work within the company involves Rom Dumping, he collects old voice synthesizers and their ROMs.  Hubert Lamontagne was hired by the company due to his knowledge of phonetics and this led to the creation of Chipspeech and Alter/Ego.

References

External links

Canadian companies established in 2000
Companies based in Montreal
Music software
Software companies established in 2000